The Orjen class of eight motor torpedo boats was built for the Royal Yugoslav Navy between 1936 and 1939 at the Lürssen Shipyard at Vegesack, Germany. They were based on the German S-2 motor torpedo boats. At the start of the Axis invasion of Yugoslavia, two boats managed to escape to Alexandria in Egypt where they continued serving with Allied forces, including in operations against Vichy French forces in Syria. The remaining ones were captured by Italian forces and commissioned in the Regia Marina (Royal Italian Navy) with modified armament; they were also used by the Italians as the model for the Italian-built CRDA 60 t motor torpedo boats.

At the time of the Italian Armistice in September 1943, two boats were scuttled by their crews. The four surviving Italian boats were taken over by German forces and commissioned in the Kriegsmarine (German Navy), serving largely in the Aegean Sea until they were finally scuttled in October 1944 as the Germans withdrew from Greece. The two boats that had escaped to the Allies in 1941 returned to Yugoslavia after the war. They were commissioned in the new Yugoslav Navy and remained in service until the early 1960s.

 Background and description 
During the early 1930s, Yugoslavia faced an economic recession brought on by the Great Depression, which was further complicated by internal political instability. In the mid-1930s, the Yugoslav government sought to improve relations with Italy and Germany to create new economic opportunities for the country. Such cooperation resulted in the acquisition of new German-constructed ships for the Royal Yugoslav Navy (JKRM), which had previously obtained ships from France and Great Britain. The first such deal came in 1936, when the navy ordered eight motor torpedo boats that were to be built by the Lürssen shipyard, based on the existing German design of the S–2 class.

Fully loaded, they displaced . Armament consisted of two  torpedo tubes and a  anti-aircraft gun on the stern.

Service history

Royal Yugoslav Navy service 
At the start of the Axis invasion of Yugoslavia, seven of the eight Orjen-class boats and the two smaller  boats were assigned to the 2nd Torpedo Division in Šibenik, with Velebit as division flagship. At the time, Orjen was being refitted at the Naval Arsenal at Tivat in the Bay of Kotor. On 11 April, a naval force consisting of several Orjen-class boats, among other ships, was expected to assist ground forces in attacking the Italian enclave of Zara which the Yugoslav High Command feared would be used as a bridgehead during the invasion. The attack, however, never materialized and the Yugoslav ships were instead attacked by Italian bombers, forcing them to retreat to the Bay of Kotor. By 17 April, the complete collapse of Yugoslav defences was imminent, prompting the commander of the 3rd Torpedo Boat Division, Ivan Kern, to suggest that Durmitor, Kajmakčalan, Dinara, Triglav, Rudnik and Suvobor sail out of the Bay of Kotor to evade capture by the Axis and continue their fight alongside Allied forces. Kern approached the commanding officers of Durmitor, Kajmakčalan, Rudnik and Suvobor with the idea, only to be rejected by all of them.

At the same time, saboteurs caused a fire on Triglav, further eroding crew morale already under pressure from desertion. Elsewhere in the Bay of Kotor, Milan Spasić and Sergej Mašera died blowing up the destroyer Zagreb to prevent her from falling into enemy hands. Following this, Kern decided to sail out with just two boats, Durmitor and Kajmakčalan, which he deemed had the most trustworthy crews, leaving the Bay of Kotor on 17 April. Because both boats were in poor condition and overloaded with personnel, the maximum speed they could achieve was 29 knots. Before passing through the Strait of Otranto, the boats successfully evaded two groups of Italian ships. They arrived at Navarino Bay in southern Greece on 19 April and at Souda Bay in Crete on 22 April, where they were tasked with escorting a convoy to Alexandria, protecting it from possible attacks from Junkers Ju 87 dive-bombers. Once in Alexandria, they joined with other JKRM vessels and aircraft that had managed to escape, forming the JKRM in exile. The two boats were first tasked with patrolling the outside of the harbour in anticipation of an attack by Axis coastal craft. In June they operated against Vichy French forces in Syria. In 1944 they were reported as being tasked with escorting convoys between Alexandria and Port Said. However, with time the serviceability of the boats became a problem because of the lack of spare parts needed for their German-built engines.

Axis service 
The remaining six boats were captured by Italian forces and commissioned in the Regia Marina (Royal Italian Navy), receiving designations MAS 3–8 D, with "MAS" standing for Motoscafo Armato Silurante (Torpedo Armed Motorboat) and the prefix D denoting they were captured in Dalmatia. The captured boats were used as a model for the Italian-built CRDA 60 t motor torpedo boats, which were designated as Motosilurante ("MS", or Motor Torpedo Boat) to distinguish them from the smaller MAS boats already in Italian service. MAS 3–5 D formed the 24th MAS Squadron and were deployed in the Aegean Sea. The designations of the former Yugoslav boats were changed again in July 1942 to conform with the new "MS" prefix, and new numerals from 41 to 46. During their Italian service, the boats were re-armed. On MS 41–44, the original  gun and a  machine gun were both removed in favor of two single-mount  Breda Model 35 L/65 guns. On MS 45–46, the armament consisted of one 40 mm L/43 gun and one 15 mm L/38 machine gun. The boats were also equipped to carry 12 to 20 depth charges. In Italian service the crew was increased to 22.

Following the Italian Armistice in September 1943, at least four of the boats were taken over by the Kriegsmarine (German Navy). MS 41 was scuttled by its crew on 9 September at Monfalcone. Sources are inconsistent regarding the boat's ultimate fate; according to Italian sources it was raised and repaired by German forces before being sunk by a mine between Porto Corsini and Porto Garibaldi in October 1944. German sources, on the other hand, claim it was never commissioned by the Kriegsmarine. MS 45 was also scuttled by its crew just a few days later, on 18 September at Cattolica. The remaining four boats, MS 42–44 and MS 46, were commissioned with the Kriegsmarine as S 601–604 respectively. They formed part of the 24th S-Boat Flotilla. Soon after their acquisition by the Germans, S 601 and S 603 were travelling from Piraeus in occupied Greece to the Bay of Kotor when S 603 suffered from a main engine failure. While operating on her cruising engine, she and S 601 were attacked by four  Supermarine Spitfire fighter-bombers of the Royal Air Force. One of the attackers was shot down by S 601, but both boats were damaged, and several crew on both boats were killed or wounded. They put into Corfu for repairs. On 22 February 1944, the two boats attempted to continue their voyage, but two carburetter fires on S 603 forced a return to port. This was followed by a fire during a test run, and several crew were badly burnt. Another attempt to leave began on 14 March, but the cruising engine on S 603 exploded, injuring two crewmen. Due to rough seas in the central Adriatic, the two boats were diverted to Salamis, with S 601 towing her disabled sister boat. In the meantime, S 602 and S 604 had also been sent to Salamis.

By late March, S 601 was conducting anti-partisan operations following a British Special Boat Service raid on Stampalia. On 29 March, she intercepted and scuttled a  sailing vessel carrying fuel near Oxeia. The following day she transported 20 German soldiers and towed the artillery lighter MAL12 to Oxeia to assist with mopping-up operations, but by the time they arrived, the enemy was gone. In late March, S 602–604 were loaded with ammunition and supplies, and sailed to Salonika, with S 603 still under tow, arriving on 18 April 1944. All four German-operated boats were scuttled or sunk in October 1944 at Salonika as the Germans withdrew from Greece due to Red Army advances in the Balkans.

Post-war service 
After the end of the war, Durmitor and Kajmakčalan, along with other JKRM ships and personnel in exile, returned to Šibenik in May 1945. They were commissioned in the new Yugoslav Navy as TČ 5 and TČ 6, later being redesignated as TČ 391 and TČ 392. Both were stricken in 1963.

See also 
List of ships of the Royal Yugoslav Navy
List of ships of the Yugoslav Navy

Notes

Footnotes

References

Books

Other sources 

 

World War II naval ships of Yugoslavia
Naval ships of Yugoslavia captured by Italy during World War II
Torpedo boats of the Royal Yugoslav Navy